Vaine is a name. Notable people with this name include:

 Krissy Vaine, American model
 Vaine Kino, Cook Islands rugby player
 Vaine Mokoroa, Cook Islands politician
 Vaine Wichman, Cook Islands politician
 Vaine Rere, Cook Islands politician
 Vaine Wilton Ivie (1907–1969), American arachnologist